Here She Comes-a-Tumblin' is the debut studio album by English progressive rock band Birdeatsbaby, first released on June 1, 2009.

Promotion and release
The album was preceded by the China Doll EP, which featured three tracks from the full album, released on January 1, 2008, as well as the free single "What You Are", released May 5, 2009, which had been cut from the record.

On April 1, 2009, the band released their first ever music video, for the song "The Trouble..." to their official Youtube channel. The video, which features stop motion-style imagery of the band performing the song, remains the most popular one on the channel with over 470,000 views as of 2021. Videos for the songs "I Always Hang Myself With The Same Rope" and "Miserable" were also uploaded around this time, but have since been made private.

Shortly after the album's release, beginning on June 18, 2009, the band went on their first tour to promote the album, making stops in the UK and Europe. Brighton-based drag queen Mister Joe Black accompanied them as their supporting act.

Reception
The album received generally positive reviews. The Glasgow-based independent music review site Bluesbunny said of Here She Comes A Tumblin''', "There might well still be hope for popular music. Pomp, circumstance and dare I say it, real style are making a comeback." Danny Wadeson of The 405'' praised the instrumentation and commented, "It’s not often that a band or one of their albums conveys such a strong sense of personality, not contrived, just an unchained force of eccentric passion, and rarer still on a debut."

Track listing

Personnel
Mishkin Fitzgerald (credited as Mishkin Mullaly) - Vocals, piano, writing
Garry Mitchell - Guitar and bass
Keely McDonald - Violin, backing vocals, writing
Ella Stimey - Cello
Philippa Bloomfield - Drums, artwork

References

External links
 

2009 debut albums
Birdeatsbaby albums